Acryptolechia is a moth genus of the superfamily Gelechioidea. It is placed in the family Depressariidae, which is often – particularly in older treatments – considered a subfamily Depressariinae, included in the Elachistidae.

Species
Acryptolechia facunda (Meyrick, 1910)
Acryptolechia malacobyrsa (Meyrick, 1921)
Acryptolechia torophanes (Meyrick, 1935)

References

Acryptolechia at funet

 
Cryptolechiinae